Lion Air and subsidiary airlines currently serve the following destinations (as of May 2022):

Destinations

Note – Green background indicates carriers active on given routes, white background indicates terminated services.

References

Destinations

zh:獅子航空#目的地